The 2011 Tipperary Senior Hurling Championship was the 121st staging of the Tipperary Senior Hurling Championship since its establishment by the Tipperary County Board in 1887.

Thurles Sarsfields were the defending champions, however, they were defeated by Clonoulty-Rossmore at the semi-final stage.

On 16 October 2011, Drom-Inch won the championship after a 1-19 to 2-14 defeat of Clonoulty-Rossmore in the final at Semple Stadium. It remains their only championship title.

Miscellaneous 
 Drom-Inch won the championship for the first time, having lost three finals previous.

External links

 The County Senior Hurling Championship 2011

References

Tipperary Senior Hurling Championship
Tipperary